Zahara Temara (born 4 July 1997) is an Australian rugby league footballer who plays as a  for the Sydney Roosters in the NRL Women's Premiership and the Burleigh Bears in the QRL Women's Premiership. 

She is an Australian and Queensland representative, who also played for the Queensland Reds in the Super W.

Background
Born in Rotorua, Temara emigrated to Australia with her family in 2007, where she played her junior rugby league for the Nerang Roosters on the Gold Coast, Queensland. Her younger sister, Chante, plays for the Brisbane Broncos NRLW team.

She played her junior football with boys until she turned 12 and went on the play for Nerang Roosters girls team. They went on to make the final but were comprehensively beaten in the final by Tweed Heads Seagulls. Thereafter the Roosters went on to win back-to-back U15 and U16 titles against Logan Brothers. She attended Worongary Primary School and to Keebra Park State High School.

Playing career

Rugby league
Zahara played for the Nerang Roosters U18 girls team and played in the Burleigh Women's Rugby league women's team at the same time after turning 17. Whilst the Nerang Roosters made the final, they were beaten by Aspley Rugby League Club. In her first year in the Burleigh women's team, they went on to make the semifinals but were knocked out by Beerwah Rugby League Club, where she played fullback. The next year Zahara played rugby union for Helensvale Rugby team, where they went on to make the semifinals, only to be knocked out by a committed Redland Bay team. She continued to play rugby league in the same season where they played Souths Magpies. South Magpies were undefeated all season and had soundly beaten the Bears during the regular season. That all changed in the final, where the Burleigh Bears managed to win their first premiership title. The Bears went on to win another 2 premierships thereafter (3 peat).

On 5 May 2017, she debuted as a 5/8 for the Australian Jillaroos against the Kiwi Ferns, scoring a try. Zahara went on tour with the Jillaroos rugby league team to PNG playing in the first ever women's rugby league match with that nation. She scored 3 tries (a hat trick) against Canada at the Rugby League World Cup 2017 where she played in the centre position. Zahara played a utility role in the World Cup final coming off the bench as a forward securing a memorable win against the Kiwi Ferns at Brisbane's Suncorp Stadium, 2 December 2017.

In June 2018, Temara was announced as one of fifteen marquee signings by the Sydney Roosters women's team which will participate in the inaugural NRL Women's Premiership in September 2018.

Rugby union
Temara had previously played 3 seasons for the Helensvale Hogs RUC rugby women's team securing representative honours with the Queensland Reds each year. Zahara continued to play Rugby League for the Burleigh Bears sometimes playing 2 games back to back on the same day. The Burleigh Bears won 3 consecutive premiership titles and was named player of the final in 2017. That same year she was selected in the Queensland women's rugby league team against New South Wales women's rugby league team. They were beaten by a well drilled NSW team in Wollongong.

In 2018 Zahara was selected to play for the Queensland Reds in the Brisbane Global Rugby Tens tournament. She played as the starting 5/8 after pool play went onto play New South Wales Waratahs in the final. The Queensland Reds went on to win the final and were crowned winners of the Brisbane Global rugby Tens. Later that year she was unable to commit to rugby union due to the ongoing semi professional Rugby League commitments. Despite this she managed to play two games. One against  WA as a reserve where they overcame a 20-point second half deficit to beat WA by 2 points.

The Queensland Reds went on to play NSW in the inaugural Super W rugby union final. Zahara started in the final but in extra time NSW prevailed winning via a penalty goal in extra time.

References

External links
Sydney Roosters profile

1997 births
Living people
Australia women's national rugby league team players
Australian female rugby league players
Australian female rugby union players
New Zealand emigrants to Australia
Rugby league five-eighths
Rugby league halfbacks
Rugby league players from Rotorua
Rugby union players from Rotorua
Sydney Roosters (NRLW) players
20th-century Australian women
21st-century Australian women